Itchy-O is a 57-member avant-garde music performance group based in Denver, Colorado, consisting of a drum-corps battery, pyrotechnics, taiko drummers, and an arsenal of electronics and crowd-roving provocateurs.

History
Formed in Denver, Colorado in 2009, itchy-O released the EP Inferno! in 2011 and signed with iconic label Alternative Tentacles to release their debut LP Burn the Navigator in September 2014. Both works were engineered by Bob Ferbrache.

The group's second album, From the Overflowing, was released on Alternative Tentacles in September 2017, followed by a cross-country supporting tour and live in-studio performance on WGN-TV on October 5, 2017. Itchy-O released their third album, Mystic Spy | Psyko Dojo, August 11, 2018 on their Mettle Studios imprint with a regional supporting tour in 2019.

During the 2020 Covid-19 pandemic, the group developed two immersive drive-in concert series taking place in Denver: August's Sypherlot: Drive-in Radio Bath and October's Hallowmass. The recordings from these performances (engineered by Evergroove Studio) were released as SYPHERLOT/HALLOWMASS 2020: DOUBLE LIVE October 30, 2021 on Alternative Tentacles.

On September 17, 2021, itchy-O played a surprise set for the grand opening of immersive art exhibition Meow Wolf's Denver location, Convergence Station.

Itchy-O has performed at Riot Fest, Red Rocks Amphitheatre, Austin's Art Outdoors festival, the Stanley Hotel Film Festival, Tucson's All Souls Procession, San Francisco's Day of the Dead Festival, Atlanta's Goat Farm and Denver's Biennial of the Americas. They have played on stage with David Byrne & St. Vincent, and shared billing with Devo, Beats Antique, Warlock Pinchers, Extra Action Marching Band, The Melvins, March Fourth, and many others.

The group has also anchored Fantastic Fest in Austin (2015-2017) and played four centerpiece shows in Hobart, Tasmania at MONA FOMA's wintertime festival in 2016.

Albums
 Inferno (EP, 2011)
 Burn the Navigator (LP, 2014)
 From the Overflowing (LP, 2017)
 Mystic Spy / Psykho Dojo (LP, 2018)
 Sypherlot/Hallowmass 2020, Double Live (LP, 2021)

Members
Ethan Alexander - BassBryan Aquino - SnareScott Allen Banning - Producer | Director | Roto-TomsNicole Banowetz - Inflatable ArtsMariah Becerra - SFXRex Blatter - Chaos Krüwe David Britton - Synthesizer | Noise DivisionGeoff Brent - Vocoder | Chaos KrüweMegs Burd - BeastRobert Drew Burleson - CymbalistCarlo Campagna - CymbalistJesse Dawson - Sampling | Electronics | Noise DivisionJackson Ellis - SFX | Pyro TechnicianEvelyn Fugate - KriēchénFez Garcia - Cymbals | PercussionMike Grimsley - Chaos KrüweJoe Hatfield - Timbales | GuitarEpona Shephard - KriēchénColin Elliot - Keys | Sampling | Noise DivisionCheyenne LaMarca - Wardrobe | Chaos KrüweElliott Grossman - Keys | Sampling | Noise DivisionNick Gonzales - Sampling | Noise DivisionLyndsey Hays - KriēchénChuck Holt - Polyphonic | Chaos KrüweStephen Karpik - Bass DrumEthan Klein - Lighting DesignerDavid Kessner - SFX | High Voltage Technician | EngineeringMicah Kessner - Fog Engineer | Chaos KrüweJohn Knudsen - KriēchénThomas Knight - TaikoAndrew Linares - Vocoder | Chaos KrüweJackson Lynn - TaikoHenri Francois Mamet - Chaos KrüweAllison Marcellus - Cymbalist | BeastMark Moffett - SFX | Pyro TechnicianJames Nelson - GuitarSean O’Malley - Quint TenorsCory Phare - PublicistHanne Schrickx - CymbalistBrad Schumacher - Noise DivisionThomas Silaghy - High Voltage | SFX | Chaos KrüweBrad Smalling - Live & Studio EngineerErin Smith - Lighting DesignerCasper Smith - Chaos KrüweJohn Smith - Chaos KrüweAbrean Sophia Marie - KriēchénAaron Spriggs - ThereminSara Valentine - KriēchénKirsten Vermulen - Co-Producer | SynthesizerBernard Wooten - Chaos KrüweAdam Zimmer - Chaos KrüweWakenyan Zyphier - Chaos KrüweCetan Zyphier - Beast | Chaos Krüwe

References

External links
itchyo.com
Press Kit
Itchy-O on the Alternative Tentacles website

Musical groups established in 2009
Musical groups from Denver
Alternative Tentacles artists